is a railway station operated by the Isumi Railway Company's Isumi Line, located in Ōtaki, Chiba Prefecture Japan.

History
Shiromigaoka Station opened on August 9, 2008 in conjunction with the developed of a large shopping center, the Ōtaki Shopping Plaza Olive, on National Route 297 on the outskirts of the town of Ōtaki. The station is only a five-minute walk from the shopping center.

Lines
Isumi Railway Company
Isumi Line

Station layout
Shiromigaoka Station has a simple side platform serving bidirectional traffic, with a three-sided rain shelter built onto the platform.

Platforms

Adjacent stations

External links
   Isumi Railway Company home page

Railway stations in Japan opened in 2008
Railway stations in Chiba Prefecture